Bartala is a neighbourhood of South West Kolkata  in West Bengal state of India. It is situated at southern part of Kolkata near to Metiabruz and Garden Reach in the east and Akra Phatak on the west. The area is populated with mainly Muslims. The area has a post office named Bartala Post office with Pin code 700018.

References

Neighbourhoods in Kolkata